Ian McCulloch is a Scottish actor of stage, film, and television.

McCulloch is perhaps best known for his role as Greg Preston in the post-apocalyptic 1975–1977 TV series Survivors and for his work in European genre cinema.

Career 
McCulloch debuted in the second episode, "Genesis", of Survivors and went on to appear regularly throughout the series. He also starred in the Italian horror films Zombie Flesh Eaters also known as Zombi II (1979) by Lucio Fulci, Zombi Holocaust (1980) by Marino Girolami, and Contamination (1980) by Luigi Cozzi.

Zombie Flesh Eaters was originally banned in the United Kingdom as part of the 1980s campaign against "video nasties". McCulloch stated that he did not see the film in its entirety, or on a big screen, until years later.

Over the years, McCulloch has had supporting roles in studio films like Where Eagles Dare (1968) with Richard Burton and Clint Eastwood, and Cromwell (1970) with Alec Guinness and Richard Harris. In addition, he has appeared in successful independent films, most notably The Ghoul (1975) with Peter Cushing and John Hurt.

He has also guest starred in many TV series, including: Manhunt (1969); Colditz (1974), as the mysterious Larry Page in "Odd Man In"; Secret Army (1977); Return of the Saint (1978); Hammer House of Horror (1980); The Professionals (1980), episode "Mixed Doubles", in which he played the physical fitness and close quarters combat instructor of Bodie and Doyle; and the Doctor Who serial Warriors of the Deep (1984).

TV and filmography

References

External links 

Living people
Male actors from Glasgow
Scottish male film actors
Scottish male television actors
Year of birth missing (living people)